Adam Wong (born 29 March 1985) is a Canadian male artistic gymnast, representing his nation at international competitions. He participated at the 2004 Summer Olympics in Athens, Greece and at the 2008 Summer Olympics in Beijing, China. In the 2006 Commonwealth Games, he took first for floor. He participated in the 2006 World Championship finishing tied for ninth. He competed for Bonavista Energy Corp. and earned a silver medal in the team Obstacle Course at the 2018 Calgary Corporate Challenge.

References

1985 births
Living people
Canadian male artistic gymnasts
Place of birth missing (living people)
Gymnasts at the 2008 Summer Olympics
Olympic gymnasts of Canada
Gymnasts at the 2004 Summer Olympics
Gymnasts at the 2006 Commonwealth Games
Commonwealth Games medallists in gymnastics
Commonwealth Games gold medallists for Canada
20th-century Canadian people
21st-century Canadian people
Medallists at the 2006 Commonwealth Games